The 2009 Western Kentucky Hilltoppers football team represented Western Kentucky University (WKU) during the 2009 NCAA Division I FBS football season. The team's head coach was David Elson. This year was their first year as a member of the Sun Belt Conference following one year as an FBS independent. The Hilltoppers played their home games at Houchens Industries–L. T. Smith Stadium in Bowling Green, Kentucky.

Schedule

Coaching change
On November 9, 2009, David Elson was officially released as Western Kentucky's head coach.  He remained as head coach until the end of the 2009 season. He was replaced by Stanford's running backs coach Willie Taggart, a Western Kentucky University alumnus.

References

Western Kentucky
Western Kentucky Hilltoppers football seasons
College football winless seasons
Western Kentucky Hilltoppers football